Předslavice is a municipality and village in Strakonice District in the South Bohemian Region of the Czech Republic. It has about 200 inhabitants.

Administrative parts
Villages of Kakovice, Marčovice, Úlehle and Všechlapy are administrative parts of Předslavice.

Geography

References

External links

Villages in Strakonice District